Casper van Overeem (1 October 1893 – 27 February 1927) was a Dutch mycologist. He was known for his studies on the fungal flora of Indonesia. He received his PhD from the University of Zurich in 1920, with a dissertation titled Über Formen abweichender Chromosomenzahl bei Oenothera ("About forms differing in chromosome number in Oenothera"). Shortly after, he went to Bogor, where he worked as an assistant in the mycology herbarium.

Eponymous taxa
Overeemia G.Arnaud (1954)
Catillaria overeemii Zahlbr. (1928)
Chiodecton overeemii Zahlbr. (1928)
Entoloma overeemii E.Horak (1977)
Graphis overeemii Zahlbr. (1928)
Lecidea overeemii Zahlbr. (1928)
Parmelia overeemii Zahlbr. (1928)
Phaeographis overeemii Zahlbr. (1928)
Pleuroflammula overeemii E.Horak (1978)
Psilocybe overeemii E.Horak & Desjardin (2006)
Ustilago overeemii Cif. (1933)

See also
List of mycologists

References

1893 births
1927 deaths
Dutch mycologists
University of Zurich alumni
Dutch expatriates in Switzerland